Brandon Valjalo (born 11 July 1998) is a South African professional skateboarder who competed in the men's street event at the 2020 Summer Olympics.

Career
Born and raised in Johannesburg, Valjalo first stood on a skateboard at the age of three when he found his brother's old board. He initially began skating as a hobby, but he started winning competitions around the age of nine and began to focus on it after that. He drew inspiration from watching Ryan Sheckler on the television show Life of Ryan. He would often have to take long drives around the city to find safe spots to practice.

Valjalo made his debut on the local professional scene in 2013, and then won the South African as well as the world youth championship title at the 2014 Kimberley Diamond Cup. He successfully defended his South African title in 2015 before the Kimberley Diamond Cup was discontinued. Valjalo finished first at the 2017 Ultimate X festival to become the African skateboarding champion, and he joined the World Cup of Skateboarding tour later that year. He also competed at the World Skateboarding Championship in 2019 and 2021, finishing in 45th and 69th place, respectively.

Valjalo qualified for the men's street competition at the 2020 Summer Olympics, earning his spot as number 45 in the World, which made him the number one ranked skater in Africa despite his overall world ranking. At the Tokyo Games, he made history as South Africa's first-ever Olympic skateboarder. Despite breaking his wrist a few days before the preliminary heats, he competed with his arm in a plaster cast and finished 18th overall.

References

External links
 Official website
 
 / Social media

Living people
1998 births
South African skateboarders
Olympic skateboarders of South Africa
Skateboarders at the 2020 Summer Olympics
Sportspeople from Johannesburg